The Chinese Stuntman (also known as Counter Attack or The Chieh Boxing Master) is a 1982 Hong Kong martial arts action film starring Bruce Li as a stunt double for kung fu films who unravels the corruption of the Hong Kong film industry. The film is considered to be part of the wave of films released in the aftermath of Bruce Lee's death, labeled Bruceploitation, as well as a postmodernist film.

Plot
A insurance clerk is hired as a stunt double. He soon becomes a movie star, but finds that the corruption of Hong Kong's film industry runs deeper the higher his stardom rises.

Cast
Bruce Li
Dan Inosanto

Style
Den of Geek writer Craig Lines has interpreted The Chinese Stuntman as a postmodernist film, noting the numerous references to Bruce Lee films, and the use of a film-within-a-film narrative. He also said that the film presents the idea that "Lee fades into the background" as Bruce Li "reaches the foreground" as an actor and director.

Reception

Den of Geek writer Craig Lines said that "The Chinese Stuntman is, without any competition, Li's masterpiece. It's got a strong plot with actual twists and characters you care about. [...] It's witty, perceptive and cleverly executed."

References

External links

1982 films
1982 martial arts films
1980s action thriller films
Bruceploitation films
Films about stunt performers
Kung fu films
Hong Kong martial arts films
Hong Kong action thriller films
1980s Hong Kong films